Oladele "Dele" Abiola Ogunseitan is a Nigerian public health researcher who is the University of California Presidential Chair at the University of California, Irvine. His research considers how toxic pollutants impact human and environmental health. He is an elected a Fellow of the American Association for the Advancement of Science.

Early life and education 
Ogunseitan was born in Nigeria. He attended Obafemi Awolowo University, where he started his studies in microbiology. After earning his master's degree in 1983, Ogunseitan moved to the United States. He joined the University of Tennessee as a doctoral student working on environmental microbiology and microbial ecology. He earned a Master of Public Health at the University of California, Berkeley. In 1998, Ogunseitan was made a Josiah Macy Jr. Foundation Fellow at the Marine Biological Laboratory.

Research and career 
In 1992 Ogunseitan joined the faculty at the University of California, Irvine. His research considers the evaluation of risk factors that damage human and environmental health, including electronic waste.

Ogunseitan was the founding chair of the University of California, Irvine Department of Population Health & Disease Prevention (2007-2019). He was made University of California Presidential Chair in 2019. He serves on the Advisory Board of the UC Center Sacramento. In 1999, he was appointed as a Faculty Fellow on the Global Environmental Assessment Project at the Belfer Center for Science and International Affairs at Harvard Kennedy School at Harvard University in Cambridge, Massachusetts. In 2019, Ogunseitan was appointed to the USAID's One Health Workforce-Next Generation project, which seeks to eliminate public health crises through training programmes for health workers.

Awards and honours 
 2016 National Academies of Sciences, Engineering, and Medicine Jefferson Science Fellow 
 2018 United States Department of State Meritorious Honour Award
 2020 Elected a Fellow of the American Association for the Advancement of Science

Selected publications

References 

Living people
Year of birth missing (living people)
Nigerian scientists
Obafemi Awolowo University alumni
University of Tennessee alumni
University of California, Berkeley alumni
University of California, Irvine faculty
Public health researchers